Chrastné is a village and municipality in Košice-okolie District in the Kosice Region of eastern Slovakia.

History
Historically, the village was first mentioned in 1357.

Geography
The village lies at an altitude of 225 metres and covers an area of 4.732 km².
It has a population of about 375 people.

Genealogical resources

The records for genealogical research are available at the state archive "Statny Archiv in Kosice, Slovakia"

 Roman Catholic church records (births/marriages/deaths): 1749-1896 (parish B)
 Greek Catholic church records (births/marriages/deaths): 1819-1898 (parish B)
 Reformated church records (births/marriages/deaths): 1753-1896 (parish B)

See also
 List of municipalities and towns in Slovakia

External links

Surnames of living people in Chrastne

Villages and municipalities in Košice-okolie District